Vilcha, also spelled Vil'cha (Ukrainian and Belarusian: Вільча), may refer to several places:

Ukraine
Vilcha, Kharkiv Oblast, an urban-type settlement in Chuhuiv Raion
Vilcha, Kyiv Oblast, an urban-type settlement in Poliske Raion

Belarus
Vilcha, Brest Region, a village in Luninets Raion
Vilcha, Gomel Region, a village in Žytkavičy Raion
Vilcha, Mogilev Region, a village in Hlusk Raion

See also
Vilca (disambiguation)